"Let Her Down Easy" is a song written and produced by American singer-songwriter Terence Trent D'Arby for his third studio album, Symphony or Damn (1993). It was released as the fourth single in November 1993 and reached number 18 in the United Kingdom.

Critical reception
Alex Kadis from Smash Hits gave the song five out of five, naming it Best New Single. She wrote, "It's a wonderful, haunting, graceful ballad with beautifully phrased vocals to take your breath away. If you've ever been in love with someone older or younger than you this will break your heart."

Track listings
 CD, 7-inch and cassette single
"Let Her Down Easy" (Single Version) – 4:13
"Turn the Page" – 5:58

 CD maxi single
"Let Her Down Easy" (Album Version) – 4:09
"Sign Your Name" – 4:38
"Delicate" featuring Des'ree – 4:19
"Let Her Down Easy" (Single Version) – 4:12

 12-inch single
"Let Her Down Easy" (Single Version)
"Turn the Page" (Club Mix)
"Turn the Page" (Dub Mix)
"Do You Love Me Like You Say?" (Original Rude Boy Mix)

Charts

George Michael version

British singer-songwriter George Michael performed "Let Her Down Easy" during his 2011–12 Symphonica Tour and included it on the Symphonica album (2014). The music video for the song was released on February 4, 2014. On March 14, 2014, "Let Her Down Easy" was digitally released as the first single from the album.

Track listing
 Digital single
"Let Her Down Easy" – 3:41

Charts

Release history

References

External links

1993 songs
1993 singles
2014 singles
Terence Trent D'Arby songs
Songs written by Terence Trent D'Arby
George Michael songs
Song recordings produced by George Michael
Columbia Records singles